Mandrem Assembly constituency is one of the 40 Legislative Assembly constituencies of Goa state in India. Mandrem is also one of the 20 constituencies falling under the North Goa Lok Sabha constituency.

It is part of North Goa district.

Members of the Legislative Assembly

Election results

2022 candidate

2019 result

2017 result

2012 result

See also
 List of constituencies of the Goa Legislative Assembly
 North Goa district

References

External links
  

North Goa district
Assembly constituencies of Goa